The 1963 Cork Senior Football Championship was the 75th staging of the Cork Senior Football Championship since its establishment by the Cork County Board in 1887. The draw for the opening round fixtures took place on 27 January 1963. The championship ran from 7 April to 13 October 1963.

Macroom entered the championship as the defending champions, however, they were beaten by University College Cork in the semi-finals.

The final was played on 13 October 1963 at the Athletic Grounds in Cork between University College Cork and St. Nicholas' in what was their first ever meeting in the final. University College Cork won the match by 1-06 to 1-05 to claim their fifth championship title overall and a first title in three years.

Garda's Bernard Coughlan was the championship's top scorer with 5-09.

Team changes

To Championship

Promoted from the Cork Junior Football Championship
 Douglas

Results

First round

Muskerry, St. Michael's, Seandún, Macroom, Urhan, Fermoy, University College Cork, Carbery and Mitchelstown received byes in this round.

Second round

Quarter-finals

Semi-finals

Final

Championship statistics

Top scorers

Overall

In a single game

Miscellaneous

 On 5 May 1963, the Urhan-Macroom match was abandoned just before half time when the father of Macroom captain Niall FitzGerald collapsed and died while watching the match.

References

Cork Senior Football Championship